Redmon is a village in Buck Township, Edgar County, Illinois, United States. The population was 137 at the 2020 census.

Geography

Demographics
As of the 2020 census there were 137 people, 85 households, and 48 families residing in the village. The racial makeup of the village was 97.81% White and 2.19% from two or more races. Hispanic or Latino of any race were 0.73% of the population.

There were 85 households, out of which 21.18% had children under the age of 18 living with them, 28.24% were married couples living together, 28.24% had a female householder with no husband present, and 43.53% were non-families. 31.76% of all households were made up of individuals, and 10.59% had someone living alone who was 65 years of age or older. The average household size was 2.48 and the average family size was 1.94.

The village's age distribution consisted of 10.9% under the age of 18, 18.8% from 18 to 24, 16.4% from 25 to 44, 37.6% from 45 to 64, and 16.4% who were 65 years of age or older. The median age was 53.8 years. For every 100 females, there were 77.4 males. For every 100 females age 18 and over, there were 72.9 males.

The median income for a household in the village was $53,250, and the median income for a family was $73,667. Males had a median income of $50,750 versus $35,313 for females. The per capita income for the village was $31,661. About 2.1% of families and 7.9% of the population were below the poverty line, including none of those under age 18 and 11.1% of those age 65 or over.

References

Villages in Edgar County, Illinois
Villages in Illinois